This is a list of airlines currently operating in South Sudan.

 Global Wings Logistics Co.Ltd ||2021 - ||- ||- || Consolidated Air cargo, Logistics supply chain

See also
 List of defunct airlines of South Sudan
 List of airports in South Sudan
 List of defunct airlines of Africa
 List of companies based in South Sudan

References

South Sudan
Airlines
Airlines
Airlines
South Sudan